Lovers of Music (lit. Trot Lovers) is a 2014 South Korean television series starring Jung Eun-ji, Ji Hyun-woo, Shin Sung-rok and Lee Se-young. It aired on KBS2 from June 23 to August 12, 2014 on Mondays and Tuesdays at 21:55 for 16 episodes.

Plot
A girl's journey to become a successful singer in the old-fashioned musical genre Trot, with the help of a songwriter and music producer who detests Trot.

Cast

Main characters
Jung Eun-ji as Choi Choon-hee
Despite being in her early twenties, Choon-hee is the bread winner of her household and she works to make ends meet while taking care of her father and younger sister. Her late mother was a trot singer, and Choon-hee inherited her singing talent and dreams of following in her footsteps. She gets all the practice time she can squeeze in by belting out in noraebangs.

Ji Hyun-woo as Jang Joon-hyun
Joon-hyun is a genius songwriter/music producer with "top star" mainstream popularity and snobbish tastes in music. Arrogant and prickly in personality, he loathes trot which he considers low-brow. But he later helps the no-name Choon-hee realize her dream of becoming a trot singer.

Shin Sung-rok as Jo Geun-woo
A business man who suddenly has to take over as CEO of his father's entertainment agency, Shine Star. Despite being cynical, he is elegant, charming and outgoing. Geun-woo signs Choon-hee as Shine Star's latest talent and later falls for her.

Lee Se-young as Park Soo-in
Seemingly the perfect girl next door, she is a trainee at Shine Star who becomes Choon-hee's biggest rival in everything, from work to love.

Supporting characters
Son Ho-jun as Seol Tae-song
Joon-hyun's manager. Taking his name from legendary trot singers Seol Woon-do, Tae Jin-ah and Song Dae-kwan, he too, dreams of becoming a trot singer someday.

Shin Bo-ra as Na Pil-nyeo
Pil-nyeo has been a trainee for ten years under the agency Shine Star. At first she bosses Choon-hee around when the latter enters the company, but the two eventually become good friends.

Lee Yi-kyung as Shin Hyo-yeol
Joon-hyun's younger colleague and rival, who holds nothing back when it comes to getting what he wants.

Kang Nam-gil as Choi Myung-sik
Yoo Eun-mi as Choi Byul
Yoon Joo-sang as Jo Hee-moon
Kim Hye-ri as Yang Joo-hee
Kim Yeo-jin as Bang Ji-sook
Jang Won-young as Lee Chul-man
Yoon Bong-gil as Lee Yoo-sik
Park Hyuk-kwon as Managing director Wang
Jo Deok-hyun as Kim Woo-gab
Kim Tae-gyum as Team leader Na
Kim Bup-rae as CEO Han

Cameo appearances
Lee Yeon-kyung as Oh Sung-joo
Ji Soo-won as Hwa-soon
Hong Kyung-min as MC of Survival Song (episode 5)
Kim Hyun-chul as Himself, music program MC (episode 1)
Yoon Gun as Audition juror (episode 2–3)
Kim In-seok as Performer on Survival Classic (episode 5)
Lee Eun-ha as Announcer of Survival Classic (episode 6)
Nam Kyung-eup as Go Eun-tae
E-Young as MC of Music Tank (episode 10)
Lee Ka-eun as MC of Music Tank (episode 10)
Hwang Min-hyun as MC of Music Tank (episode 10)
Im So-yeon as Radio DJ
Lee Chae-mi as Sibling on the beach (episode 12)
Jeon Jun-hyeok as Sibling on the beach (episode 12)

Ratings

Awards and nominations

Original soundtrack

References

External links
  
 
 
 

2014 South Korean television series debuts
2014 South Korean television series endings
Korean Broadcasting System television dramas
Korean-language television shows
South Korean musical television series
South Korean romantic comedy television series
Television series by JS Pictures